A retail clerk, also known as a sales clerk, shop clerk, retail associate, or (in the United Kingdom) shop assistant or customer service assistant, is a service role in a retail business.

A retail clerk obtains or receives merchandise, totals bills, accepts payment, takes orders, and makes change for customers in retail stores such as drugstores, candystores, or liquorstores (thus, the position may partially overlap with that of a cashier or teller). They clean shelves, counters, or tables; stock shelves or tables with merchandise; set up advertising displays or arrange merchandise on counters or tables to promote sales; stamp, mark, or tag prices on merchandise; and obtain merchandise requested by customers or receive merchandise selected by customers. They are expected to answer customers' questions concerning location, price, and use of merchandise; to total the price and tax on merchandise purchased by customers to determine a bill; and to accept payment, make change, and wrap or bag the merchandise for customers. They may remove and record the amount of cash in the register at the end of the shift. A retail clerk, particularly in a smaller store, may keep records of sales, prepare inventories of stock, or order merchandise.

A retail clerk is expected to be able to use basic math, read and write, as well as operate cash registers and apply discounts. They are also expected to stand on their feet for long periods of time.

See also
 Clerks, 1994 film by Kevin Smith

References  

Personal care and service occupations
People in retailing
Retail clerks